Wayne Michael Kerrins (born 5 August 1965) is an English former footballer who played for Fulham, Port Vale, Leyton Orient, Farnborough Town, Dulwich Hamlet and Kingstonian.

Career
Kerrins started his career with Fulham, who finished the 1984–85 campaign in ninth place in the Second Division. He was sent out on loan to John Rudge's Port Vale in March 1985. He played eight Fourth Division games for the "Valiants" at the end of the 1984–85 season. Back with Ray Harford's "Cottagers", he was unable to prevent the club being relegated in last place in 1985–86. New boss Ray Lewington then led Fulham to 18th in the Third Division in 1986–87 and ninth in 1987–88. He was loaned out to Frank Clark's Leyton Orient in the 1988–89 season, and played three Fourth Division games for the "O's". His spell on Brisbane Road was brief, and he was released from his contract after returning to Craven Cottage. He moved on to Conference club Farnborough Town, and later Dulwich Hamlet and Kingstonian.

Career statistics
Source:

References

1965 births
Living people
People from Brentwood, Essex
English footballers
Association football midfielders
Fulham F.C. players
Port Vale F.C. players
Leyton Orient F.C. players
Farnborough F.C. players
Dulwich Hamlet F.C. players
Kingstonian F.C. players
English Football League players
National League (English football) players
Isthmian League players